Robert Whitlock Adams is a Technical Fellow at Analog Devices, Inc. (ADI) in Wilmington, Massachusetts. His focus is on signal processing and analog-to-digital conversion for professional audio. He is a leader in the development of sigma-delta converters, introducing architectural advances including mismatch shaping, multi-bit quantization, and continuous-time architectures.

Adams graduated with a Bachelor of Science in Electrical Engineering from Tufts University in 1976. From 1977 to 1988 he worked for DBX, a professional audio recording company. There, he helped develop the industry's first audio converter with greater than 16-bit resolution, as well as one of the earliest digital audio recorders. In 1988, he joined the Converter Group of Analog Devices as a Senior Staff Designer, and went on to develop ADI's first sigma-delta converters in partnership with Paul Ferguson. He produced the world's first monolithic asynchronous sample rate converters (the AD1890 family), and he created ADI's sigmaDSP line of audio-specific digital signal processing cores.

As of 1998, Adams had received 15 patents related to audio signal processing.

Awards and honors

Elected Fellow of the Audio Engineering Society (AES), 1991
Received AES Silver Medal Award, 1995
Included in Electronic Design  magazine's Engineering Hall of Fame, 2011
Became a Fellow of the Institute of Electrical and Electronics Engineers (IEEE), 2012 "for contributions to analog and digital signal processing"
Received the IEEE Donald O. Pederson Award, 2015 "for contributions to noise-shaping data converter circuits, digital signal processing, and log-domain analog filters"
Elected as a member into the National Academy of Engineering in 2018 for contributions to digital storage and reproduction of high-fidelity audio.

References 

Year of birth missing (living people)
Living people
20th-century American engineers
21st-century American engineers
20th-century American inventors
21st-century American inventors
American audio engineers
Analog electronics engineers
Fellow Members of the IEEE
Members of the United States National Academy of Engineering
Tufts University School of Engineering alumni